Palmiero is an Italian surname. Notable people with the surname include:

Amy Palmiero-Winters (born 1972), American below-knee amputee athlete
Luca Palmiero (born 1996), Italian footballer

See also
Palmieri

Italian-language surnames